Yang Wei-ting (born 22 September 1994) is a Taiwanese athlete competing in the sprint hurdles. He represented his country at three outdoor and two indoor Asian Championships.

His personal bests are 13.57 seconds in the 110 metres hurdles (+0.5 m/s, Taipei 2017) and 7.87 seconds in the 60 metres hurdles (Doha 2016).

Competition record

References

1994 births
Living people
Taiwanese male hurdlers
Athletes (track and field) at the 2018 Asian Games
Asian Games competitors for Chinese Taipei
Competitors at the 2017 Summer Universiade
Competitors at the 2019 Summer Universiade